Taylor County is a county located in the U.S. state of Kentucky. As of the 2020 census, the population was 26,023. Its county seat is Campbellsville. Settled by people from Virginia, Pennsylvania, Maryland, and North Carolina after the American Revolutionary War, the county was organized in 1848 in the Highland Rim region. It is named for United States Army General Zachary Taylor, later President of the United States. Taylor County was the 100th of the 120 counties created by Kentucky. The Campbellsville Micropolitan Statistical Area includes all of Taylor County.

Geography

Adjacent counties
 Marion County  (north)
 Casey County  (east)
 Adair County  (southeast/CST Border)
 Green County  (south & west/CST Border)
 LaRue County  (northwest)

Demographics

As of the census of 2000, there were 22,927 people, 9,233 households, and 6,555 families residing in the county. The racial makeup of the county was 93.62% White, 5.06% Black or African American, 0.10% Native American, 0.18% Asian, 0.02% Pacific Islander, 0.32% from other races, and 0.70% from two or more races.  0.82% of the population were Hispanic or Latino of any race.

There were 9,233 households, out of which 30.90% had children under the age of 18 living with them, 56.40% were married couples living together, 11.50% had a female householder with no husband present, and 29.00% were non-families. 26.00% of all households were made up of individuals, and 12.20% had someone living alone who was 65 years of age or older.  The average household size was 2.41 and the average family size was 2.89.

In the county, the population was spread out, with 23.40% under the age of 18, 10.40% from 18 to 24, 26.90% from 25 to 44, 24.10% from 45 to 64, and 15.20% who were 65 years of age or older.  The median age was 38 years. For every 100 females, there were 92.70 males.  For every 100 females age 18 and over, there were 88.70 males.

The median income for a household in the county was $28,089, and the median income for a family was $33,854. Males had a median income of $26,633 versus $20,480 for females. The per capita income for the county was $15,162.  About 14.20% of families and 17.50% of the population were below the poverty line, including 23.70% of those under age 18 and 18.30% of those age 65 or over.

Communities

 Acton
 Bengal
 Black Gnat
 Campbellsville (county seat)
 Elk Horn
 Finley
 Hatcher
 Hobson
 Mannsville
 Merrimac
 Saloma
 Spurlington
 Sweenyville
 Yuma

Politics

Taylor County is represented in the Kentucky House of Representatives by Republican Sarge Pollock and in the state Senate by another Republican, Max Wise. In 2019, Republican Barry Smith took office as county judge. Smith unseated the Democrat Eddie Rogers in the general election held on November 6, 2018.

Education
School districts include:
 Campbellsville Independent School District
 Taylor County School District

See also

 National Register of Historic Places listings in Taylor County, Kentucky

References

 
Kentucky counties
1848 establishments in Kentucky
Populated places established in 1848